Thelocactus bicolor, the glory of Texas, is  a species of flowering plant in the cactus family, widely  distributed in the northern Chihuahuan Desert of the USA (Texas) and Mexico. Plants are usually solitary, but may form clumps. The petals are purplish-pink, fading to white. The inner petal tips form a circle of red surrounding a prominent yellow boss.

This cactus is grown as an ornamental.  A warm, dry, sunny spot in sharply-drained specialist cactus compost must be provided. It has gained the Royal Horticultural Society’s Award of Garden Merit.

Lower taxa
Thelocactus bicolor subsp. bolaensis (Runge) Doweld
Thelocactus bicolor subsp. flavidispinus (Backeb.) N.P. Taylor
Thelocactus bicolor subsp. schwarzii (Backeb.) N.P. Taylor

Gallery

References

bicolor
Flora of Mexico
Least concern plants
Plants described in 1922